The 1898 Rhode Island gubernatorial election was held on April 6, 1898. Incumbent Republican Elisha Dyer Jr. defeated Democratic nominee Daniel T. Church with 57.74% of the vote.

General election

Candidates
Major party candidates
Elisha Dyer Jr., Republican
Daniel T. Church, Democratic

Other candidates
James P. Reid, Socialist Labor
Edwin A. Lewis, Prohibition

Results

References

1898
Rhode Island
Gubernatorial